Canarium  labiatum, common name the Samar Conch, is a species of sea snail, a marine gastropod mollusk in the family Strombidae, the true conchs.

Description
The shell size varies between 20 mm and 50 mm.

Distribution
This species is distributed in the Indian Ocean along Aldabra, Chagos and Tanzania; in the Western Pacific along Southeast Australia.

Phylogeny

In 2006, Latiolais and colleagues proposed a cladogram (a tree of descent) that attempts to show the phylogenetic relationships of 34 species within the family Strombidae. The authors analysed 31 species in the genus Strombus including Canarium labiatum (referred to as Strombus labiatus in their analysis), and three species in the allied genus Lambis. The cladogram was based on DNA sequences of both nuclear histone H3 and mitochondrial cytochrome-c oxidase I (COI) protein-coding gene regions. In this proposed phylogeny, Strombus labiatus (= Canarium labiatum) and Strombus microurceus are closely related and appear to share a common ancestor.

References

 Spry, J.F. (1961). The sea shells of Dar es Salaam: Gastropods. Tanganyika Notes and Records 56
 alls, J.G. (1980). Conchs, tibias and harps. A survey of the molluscan families Strombidae and Harpidae. T.F.H. Publications Ltd, Hong Kong

External links
 

Strombidae
Gastropods described in 1798